Tupiza is a city in Potosí Department, Bolivia. It is located at an elevation of about 2850 m. The population is 25,709 (2012 estimate). Tupiza and its environs are characterized by dramatic red escarpments which jut ruggedly skyward from the coarse, gray terrain; green agricultural land adjacent to the nearby Tupiza River provides welcome respite from the otherwise arid, thorny surroundings. The area quebradas are susceptible to flash flood runoff from sudden cloudbursts.

Tupiza is the capital of the Sud Chichas Province within the Potosí Department.  It is accessible via bus from Villazón to the south (and thereby both Argentina and Tarija) and Potosí to the north, as well as via the north-south train which served the mining settlements and runs the same route.  From Tupiza, various towns in the local mining districts are accessible, as is the Salar de Uyuni.

Legend has it that Butch Cassidy and the Sundance Kid met their end at the hands of the Bolivian army near Tupiza, concluding their notorious string of bank robbery raids. Various local outfitters provide horseback or jeep tours to the rumored site.

References

External links
 Tupiza City, Nuestrapiza(Spanish)
 Tupiza profile (English)
 Tupiza pics, additional materials (Spanish)

Populated places in Potosí Department

it:Tupiza